Spring day is a holiday marking the coming of the spring season, which takes place in different countries, on varying dates.

Northern Hemisphere

Albania

Albania celebrates the lunar Spring Day, the so-called Summer Day, on 14 March, and in 2004 it became a national holiday. It is an old pagan practice, particularly popular in the city of Elbasan, Central Albania.

According to some sources, Dita e Verës derives from the Arbëreshë, an Albanian community that lives in Italy since the fifteenth century. On 14 March, the Arbëreshë of the Italian coast, collect a tuft of grass roots and soil, bringing it home to commemorate the anniversary of their emigration from Albania. In fact, some sources date back this celebration to the ancient Illyria. At that time, the feast was celebrated on 1 March, which according to the Julian calendar, corresponded to the first day of the year.

Pilgrimages were made to the highest peaks in the Albanian mountains to be as close as possible to the Sun God and pray for the goodness and prosperity of the new year. The great fire crossed by men and young people symbolized the end of winter. Instead, wreaths and garlands on the doors of the houses wished good luck. The purity of the celebration has weakened over the centuries but came to this day thanks to the tradition preserved in the city of Elbasan.

The ritual of the Dita e Verës begins on the previous day with the preparation of sweets: the revani and ballakume, the blended butter, sugar, corn flour and egg yolks cooked in a wood oven.
During the evening ballakume, dried figs, walnuts, turkey legs, boiled eggs, Simit (a typical sandwich of the city) are distributed to members of the family. The oldest woman of the house remains awake at night and goes from room to room to put down grass on the cushions of couples, young people and children, a ritual that symbolizes the regeneration and quickening.

On the morning of 14 March, the elderly leave the door open as a sign of generosity, a pitcher filled with fresh water and take home a clump of green grass. The youngest fertilizes the orange and olive trees, but the smaller ones are the first to make the "lucky" visits to neighbors and relatives who give them turkey legs, dried figs and nuts. Finally lunch on 14 March, should be eaten outdoors in the company of friends and relatives.

Estonia
Estonia celebrates Spring Day on 1 May.

Iran

Iran celebrates Spring day at 21 March as its only new year celebration. This national celebration is called Nowruz in Iran.

Bangladesh

Bangladesh celebrates Spring day on 13 February as the first of the month of Falgun. It is the beginning of the Boshonto, the Spring season for Bengalis.

Southern Hemisphere

Argentina
Argentina celebrates the beginning of spring, conventionally, on 21 September, one or two days before the actual spring equinox. This day also marks Students' Day.

Though this is not a work-free public holiday, it coincides with Students' Day, which is a no-school day for students on all the levels of the education system. The holiday is therefore mostly observed and dominated by teenagers and young adults, who massively take over public parks, beaches and other outdoor venues in the larger cities, and enjoy sports or picnics.

Local administrations usually offer the public a number of entertainment shows, such as free rock concerts. In recent years security operations have been staged to avoid incidents such as fights and vandalism, as well as controls to curb the consumption of alcoholic beverages.

Paraguay
Paraguay celebrates the beginning of spring on 21 September, one or two days before the actual spring equinox. This day also marks Youth Day.

Uruguay
Uruguay celebrates the beginning of spring, on 21 September, one or two days before the actual spring equinox.

Bolivia
Bolivia celebrates the beginning of spring, on 21 September, it is also Students' day and "día del amor", on this day youth will send cards, chocolates and flowers to their friends, mates, or lovers.

South Africa
South Africa Celebrates spring Day on the 1 September. Spring day traditions in South Africa range from having a traditional braai to shaving your head and beard. In many townships, children celebrate Spring Day by spraying each other with water. However, in some urban settlements everyone participates.

Types of secular holidays
Spring holidays

es:Primavera#Festividades